Christian Nationalist Crusade was an American antisemitic organization which operated from St. Louis, Missouri. Its founder was Gerald L. K. Smith. It sold and distributed, inter alia, The International Jew, and subscribed to the antisemitic views embodied in The Protocols of the Elders of Zion which it also published. According to details published by the Library of Congress, Smith "prepared" The International Jew for publication, date possibly in the 1950s.

History 
Smith founded this entity in St. Louis, Missouri, in 1942, with the purpose to "preserve America as a Christian nation being conscious of a highly organized campaign to substitute Jewish tradition for Christian tradition". Its purpose was also to oppose Communism, one world government and immigration. It also aimed to "fight mongrelization and all attempts to force the intermixture of the black and White races". It was effectively a political party, and promoted antisemitic and racist causes, particularly in St. Louis from the 1940s through the 1950s.

It engaged in publication and distribution of texts advocating its views, and had produced monthly magazine, called The Cross and the Flag. Particular targets identified by its head, Gerald L. K. Smith, included radio commentator Drew Pearson, Hollywood communists, and jazz music. Its headquarters were in St. Louis until 1953.

The Christian Nationalist Crusade engaged in the circulation of petitions urging national action in support of segregation.

As a political party, the Christian Nationalist Party ran candidates in the Missouri general election of 1950. Its candidates were defeated. Also, the party nominated Douglas MacArthur for president in 1952. MacArthur's name appeared on the ballot in Missouri, where he received 535 votes, but without his endorsement.

The Rev. Alvin Mayall, of Bakersfield, Calif., headed the organization in 1968 when he also was named head of the Wallace-for-President campaign. Wallace campaign organizers concluded Mayall "had far more interest in Jew-baiting than in electing George Wallace."

It moved to Glendale, California, in 1953. It was disbanded in 1977.

See also 
 Christian nationalism
 Francis Alphonse Capell

References

External links
Western Historical Manuscript Collection, University of Missouri-St. Louis 

Late modern Christian antisemitism
Protocols of the Elders of Zion
Christian Identity
Anti-communist organizations in the United States
Defunct far-right political parties in the United States